The Valley of Sula (also, Sula Valley) is the largest alluvial valley of Honduras. It is located in the northwest of the country, and within it lie several of Honduras's most important cities, such as San Pedro Sula, El Progreso, Choloma, Puerto Cortés, Villanueva, and Tela.

Hydrologically speaking, the area has two of the most important basins of Honduras: the basins of the Ulúa and Chamelecón rivers, leaving the area vulnerable to flooding, mainly in the rainy season.

The valley's ecosystem is mainly composed of tropical dry forests.

Economy 

The valley's fertile soils have boosted its agricultural development.

Around 65% of the Gross domestic product of Honduras is generated in the valley, representing over 50% of the country's exports. Within it resides roughly 30% of the national population, due to the high concentration of the workforce, both in urban and rural communities.

Municipalities of the Sula Valley

See also 
 River Ulúa
 River Chamelecón

References

External links

Landforms of Honduras
Valleys of North America